The 1933–34 season was the 59th season of competitive football in England.

Diary of the season
 6 January 1934 – Arsenal manager Herbert Chapman dies of pneumonia.

Honours

Notes = Number in parentheses is the times that club has won that honour. * indicates new record for competition

Football League

First Division

Second Division

Third Division North

Third Division South

Top goalscorers

First Division
Jack Bowers (Derby County) – 34 goals

Second Division
Pat Glover (Grimsby Town) – 42 goals

Third Division North
Alf Lythgoe (Stockport County) – 46 goals

Third Division South
Albert Dawes (Northampton Town and Crystal Palace) – 27 goals

References